Technolangue/Easy was the first evaluation campaign for the syntactic parsers of French.

This project was supported by the French Research Ministry (Ministère de recherche français).

Technolangue/Easy included four tasks between 2003 and 2006:
 corpora constitution
 production of consensual annotation guidelines
 manual corpora annotation using a dedicated annotation formalism
 evaluation of the participating parsers

13 laboratories and companies submitted their parser to the evaluation (making a total of 16 runs) with 7 research laboratories, 3 R&D institutes and 3 private companies. Said in other terms, most of the existing French parsers competed.

References
 Gendner V., Illouz G., Jardino M., Monceaux P., Robba I. Vilnat A (2003) PEAS, the first instantiation of a comparative framework for evaluating parsers of French, Proceedings of the Research Note Sessions of the 10th Conference of the EACL, Budapest, Hungary
 Paroubek P., Robba I., Vilnat A., Ayache C. (2006) Data annotations and measures in EASY, the evaluation campaign for parsers in French LREC, Genoa

External links
 protocol description (in English)
 Technolangue/Easy web page (in French)

French language
Natural language parsing